Delești is a commune in Vaslui County, Western Moldavia, Romania. It is composed of six villages: Albești, Delești, Fundătura, Hârșova, Mănăstirea and Răduiești. It also included four other villages until 2004, when these were split off to form Cozmești Commune.

References

Communes in Vaslui County
Localities in Western Moldavia